'''Baldhan Khurd, is a village in Jatusana Block in Rewari District of Haryana State, India. It belongs to Gurgaon Division. It is located 21 km towards west from District headquarters Rewari. 7 km from Jatusana. 315 km from State capital Chandigarh. Khushpura (2 km), Rampuri (3 km), Motla Kalan (3 km), Babroli (3 km), Fatehpuri Tappa Dahina (4 km) are the nearby villages to Baldhan Khurd.

References 

Villages in Rewari district